Michael Kim may refer to:

Michael Kim (television anchor) (born 1964), American television anchor, 120 Sports host
Michael Kim (pianist) (born 1968), Canadian pianist, director of the School of Music at University of Minnesota
Michael Kim (footballer) (born 1973), Canadian soccer manager
Mike Kim (born 1976), North Korea expert, founder of NGO Crossing Borders
Michael Kim (singer) (born 1986), South Korean singer, lead vocalist of R&B group One Way
Michael Kim (golfer) (born 1993), American golfer
Michael Kim (trial lawyer), American trial lawyer, founding partner of Kobre & Kim
Michael Kim (businessman), billionaire private equity investor, founding partner of MBK Partners
Mike Kim (poker player)